Paola Hernández Díaz (born 25 July 2002) is a Spanish footballer who plays as a midfielder for Granadilla.

Club career
Hernández started her career at Granadilla B.

References

External links
Profile at La Liga

2002 births
Living people
Women's association football midfielders
Spanish women's footballers
Footballers from Santa Cruz de Tenerife
UD Granadilla Tenerife players
Primera División (women) players
Segunda Federación (women) players